Jyothika is an Indian actress who predominantly appears in Tamil films. She also acted in some Telugu, Malayalam, Kannada and Hindi films. She won one National Award, three Filmfare Awards, four Tamil Nadu State Film Awards, four Dinakaran Awards, International Tamil Film Awards, Cinema Express Awards and other awards and nominations. She is also a recipient of the Kalaimamani Award. She had been ranked among the best actresses of South India by The Times of India.

National Film Awards

IIFA Utsavam Awards

Kalaimamani Awards

Ananda Vikatan Cinema Awards

Tamil Nadu State Film Awards

Edison Awards (Tamil)

Filmfare Awards South

Filmfare Awards

International Tamil Film Awards

Film Fans Association Awards

Dinakaran Film Awards

South Indian International Movie Awards

Vijay Awards

Behindwoods Gold Medals

Zee Cinema Awards Tamil

JFW Awards

Cinema Express Awards

Other awards and honours

As film producer

References 

Jyothika